San Silvestro is a church building in the sestiere of San Polo of Venice, northern Italy.

The church is located in the business district of Rialto.  Originally, in the 12th century, it was under the jurisdiction of the Patriarch of Grado. After rebuilding, it was reconsecrated in 1422, and in 1485 it merged with the Oratory of Santa Maria dei Patriarchi e di Ognissanti. After a partial collapse in 1820, the church was entirely rebuilt from 1837, being reconsecrated in 1850, to designs by Giovanni Meduna. The facade is modern, and was completed in 1909 by Giuseppe Sicher. The Baroque ceiling has paintings by Ludovico Dorigny. The altars were designed in the 19th century by Santi and decorated by the sculptor Giovanni Antonio Dorigo.

The interior has four Renaissance panels, and a Baptism of Christ by Tintoretto.

The Adoration of the Magi by Paolo Veronese is a large oil painting on canvas painted for the church in 1573 which has been in the National Gallery, London since the church sold it in 1855, presumably to finance the rebuilding.  The painting was commissioned by the confraternity of Saint Joseph, the Scuola di San Giuseppe, and placed beside their altar on the left hand wall of the nave.  They were not one of the very wealthy Scuole Grandi of Venice, nor trade-based like others with altars in the church, but essentially devotional, and they included female members.

The church had a number of significant paintings, and the Veronese was next to the altar of St Joseph on the left side wall, which in the next century was given an altarpiece by Johann Carl Loth of the unusual subject of Joseph presenting the newborn Jesus to God the Father, which remains in the church.  The Veronese had some fame, being singled out for mention in early guide books such as Giovanni Stringa's 1604 revision of Francesco Sansovino's Venetia.  In 1670 agents of the new Cosimo III de' Medici, Grand Duke of Tuscany, who had failed to persuade the convent of Saint Catherine to sell Veronese's Mystical Marriage of St Catherine of 1575 (now Gallerie dell'Accademia), turned to San Silvestro and attempted to bribe every member of the confraternity to sell the work, but failed after two years.

Notes

References

Penny, Nicholas,  National Gallery Catalogues (new series): The Sixteenth Century Italian Paintings, Volume II, Venice 1540-1600, 2008, National Gallery Publications Ltd, 

Roman Catholic churches in Venice
Roman Catholic churches completed in 1422
Roman Catholic churches completed in 1909
15th-century Roman Catholic church buildings in Italy
20th-century Roman Catholic church buildings in Italy